"Forever" is a song written and recorded by British singer Charli XCX from her fourth album, How I'm Feeling Now (2020). Charli XCX produced the song with A. G. Cook and BJ Burton, and it was released on 9 April 2020, by Atlantic as the lead single from the album. "Forever" is a pop, synth-pop, and psychedelic song that features dark wave and electronic influences.

Background and release
On 7 April 2020, Charli XCX shared snippets of "Forever" on social media. On 8 April 2020, Charli XCX uploaded three photos of herself, shot by her boyfriend, to her Instagram and Twitter account and asked fans to vote for one photo to be the cover. On 9 April 2020, Charli XCX announced that "Forever" would be released at 07:30 PM BST / 11:30 AM PST and premiere on BBC Radio 1 as Annie Mac's Hottest Record in the World. She also announced three official artworks for the single were commissioned. One version was created by American artist Seth Bogart and used on Spotify; one version by French artist Regards Coupables, used on YouTube, Amazon Music and Deezer; and one version by American singer-songwriter Caroline Polachek, used on Apple Music. The official music video for "Forever", featuring clips sent in from fans, was released on 17 April 2020.

Composition
"Forever" was written by Charli XCX and produced by A. G. Cook and BJ Burton. It runs for four minutes and three seconds. Musically, it is a pop, psychedelic, and synth-pop song that features dark wave and electronic influences. The song also features "lo-fi beats and luminous synths" with Charli singing about "an everlasting love that will remain even if the relationship fades away or if they're not physically together".

Critical reception 
Trey Alston from MTV called the song a "robotic ballad" that was about "sheer adoration, to the most mechanical degree", in addition to writing that "if toasters listened to songs when they made love, [this song] would be on their playlist. Alston described the opening of the song as a "harsh opening of boiling synths [transitioning] into a slightly smoother sore throat of a cyborg who's doing its best impression of a lovestruck human". Alston also felt that the sound was a "Terminator-like landscape". Justin Curto from Vulture called the song "muted" and "somewhat dissonant", that "would sound right at home tacked on the end of Charli". Lake Schatz of Consequence of Sound described the song as an "emotional number" that "[wrestles] with intimacy issues — especially during this time of social distancing". Variety’s Jem Aswad felt that the song "bears many of the hallmarks of the prolific artist’s work over the past couple of year", including Charli’s two mixtapes. Calling the melody "indelible", Aswad mentions Cook’s trademark "echoing synthesizers" and how Charli uses auto tune as an "instrument in itself rather than as pitch correction". Michael Love Michael of Paper, felt that the message of the song was about " reminiscing about the good times with an ex", and while Charli was "singing about the future, the production and overall feel of 'Forever' couldn't sound more relevant". James from Stereogum described the song as "perfectly goofy and giddy", "something that sounds ephemeral but feels like it will last forever". James also felt that there was "nothing slapdash" about the track, writing that the lyrics talked about a "part of the compressed reality we’re all experiencing: being trapped in close to someone that you care about" as the single "switches between abrasive and elated", "[choosing] to embrace happiness in the moment". On their year-end list, Pitchfork named "forever" as one of the best songs of 2020.

Credits and personnel
Credits adapted from Tidal.

 Charli XCX – vocals, songwriting, backing vocals
 A. G. Cook – production, songwriting, drum programming, programming, synthesizer, vocal production, xylophone
 BJ Burton – production, songwriting, drum programming, programming, synthesizer, vocal production
 Geoff Swan – mixing
 Stuart Hawkes – mastering
 Niko Battistini – assistant mix engineer

Charts

Release history

References

2020 singles
2020 songs
Charli XCX songs
Songs written by Charli XCX
Songs written by A. G. Cook
Songs written by BJ Burton